Shadi Khan is a village in Chach Valley of Attock District in Punjab Province of Pakistan.

Suicide bombing
On 16 August 2015, the interior minister of Punjab, Shuja Khanzada, and at least 22 others were killed in a suspected suicide bombing here.

References

External links
Shadi Khan area map

Villages in Attock District